Strugi Krasnye is an urban locality (a work settlement) and the administrative center of Strugo-Krasnensky District of Pskov Oblast, Russia, located  northeast of Pskov. Municipally, it is incorporated as Strugi Krasnye Urban Settlement, the only urban settlement in the district. Population:

History
Named after a nearby village, the settlement was founded in the mid-19th century as the railway station of Belaya during the construction of the railroad. At the time, it belonged to Luzhsky Uyezd of Saint Petersburg Governorate. In 1905, it was renamed Strugi Belye, after the estate of N. M. Lakhtin. In 1919, Strugi Belye was an arena of important events of the Russian Civil War. Originally, the area east of Lake Peipus was under control of the revolutionary government. On October 4, 1919 the White Army troops of Nikolai Yudenich during an advance captured the station of Strugi Belye. On November 6, 1919, it was given its present name by the order of G. A. Tomchuk, a commander of an armored train, after the village was taken from the White Guard Armies, to avoid connotations with White Army (with krasny meaning red in Russian).

On August 1, 1927, the uyezds were abolished, and Strugo-Krasnensky District was established, with the center in Strugi Krasnye. The governorates were abolished as well, and the district belonged to Luga Okrug of Leningrad Oblast. On July 23, 1930 the okrugs were abolished, and the districts became directly subordinate to the oblast. Between March 22, 1935 and September 19, 1940, Strugo-Krasnensky District was a part of Pskov Okrug of Leningrad Oblast, one of the okrugs formed at the state boundaries of Soviet Union. Between August, 1941, and February, 1944 Strugo-Krasnensky District was occupied by German troops. On August 23, 1944, Strugo-Krasnensky District was transferred to newly established Pskov Oblast. Urban-type settlement status was granted to Strugi Krasnye on December 7, 1958 by the Decision #430 of Pskov Oblast Executive Committee.

Population

Economy

Industry
A forestry farm is one of the largest industrial enterprises in the settlement. Timber export is well-developed.  There is also a sand quarry.

Transportation
The settlement also serves as a train station of the Warsaw – Saint Petersburg Railway.

Strugi Krasnye is connected by the road with the M20 highway between Saint Petersburg and Pskov.

Culture and recreation
Strugi Krasnye hosts the Strugo-Krasnensky District Museum, the only museum in the district. A museum of local lore operates in the settlement since 1991.

References

Sources

External links
Unofficial website of Strugi Krasnye 
Photos of Strugi Krasnye

Urban-type settlements in Pskov Oblast
Luzhsky Uyezd